Hydroxycholesterol may refer to:

 7α-Hydroxycholesterol
 20S-Hydroxycholesterol
 22R-Hydroxycholesterol (22(R)-Hydroxycholesterol)
 Cerebrosterol (24(S)-Hydroxycholesterol)
 
 27-Hydroxycholesterol